Foan is an English surname. Notable people with this surname include:
 Albert Foan (1923–2009), English football player
 Gilbert Foan (1887–1935), British hairdresser and politician
The name Foan comes from the French/Middle English term faun which is a young animal/cub/deer.  The name first originated in the late 12th Century.